Izdebnik is a village in the administrative district of Gmina Lanckorona, within Wadowice County, Lesser Poland Voivodeship, in southern Poland.

The village has an approximate population of 2,000.

References

Izdebnik